Red Cow (Pa-ra A-du-ma) is a 2018 Israeli independent drama film, directed and written by Tsivia Barkai Yacov. The film premiered at the 2018 Berlin International Film Festival, and won the Best Israeli Film and Best Debut Film awards at the Jerusalem Film Festival.

Plot synopsis 
Benni (Avigail Kovari) is a 17 year old who lives with her father, Yehoshua (Gal Toren), in Silwan, an illegal settlement in East Jerusalem. When a red heifer is born, Yehoshua sees it as a sign of the coming of the Third Temple. Benni is charged with caring for the heifer. When she falls in love with Yael (Moran Rosenblatt), a national service teacher, the close relationship between Benni and Yehoshua begins to crack. As tensions rise, Benni is determined to secure a future for Yael and her.

Cast

Production 
The film is Barkai Yacov's directorial debut. In an interview, Barkai Yacov said that the movie was highly personal: She grew up religious, in Beit El, one of the first West Bank settlements, and had a relationship with another young woman in her teens. "The film’s geography, plot and the emotions of its characters are all close to me," she said.

Red Cow was produced by Itai Tamir and received funding from the New Fund for Film and Television and the Israel Film Fund.

Reception 
 Israel
Daily newspaper ynet critic Shmulik Duvdevani commended the film for providing a glimpse of an area of Israeli life that is seldom seen in the arts – the religious settlements in the West Bank. He opined, however, that the lesbian story line diminished the film and made it somewhat "expected". Haaretz critic Nirit Enderman gave the film three out of five stars. She wrote that the film is "refreshing" in that it provides representation to two under-represented groups – lesbians and settlers – but also felt that the youth LGBT romance did not fit in well with the rest of the highly-political film.

 International
In the Hollywood Reporter, Jordan Mintzer found the political aspects of the film downplayed, and the LGBT storyline integral to the drama: "Procuring fine performances from her three leads, Yacov keeps the drama intimate while hinting at the greater issues raised by men like Yehoshua who believe Israel to be a strictly Jewish state, and who are prepared to live in the heart of Palestinian territory in order to prove their point." Sara Ward, in Screen Daily, praised the actors and the cinematography: "Red Cow... moves between the use of walls, fences and shadows to stress the boundaries surrounding its protagonist, and mirroring her restless fervour in its jittery handheld camerawork. Paired with just the right mood — urgent in tone yet measured in pace — the film vibrates with disarming authenticity as a result."

Awards

See also 
 The Secrets (film)
 Disobedience (2017 film)
 Eyes Wide Open (film)
 List of LGBT-related films directed by women

References

External links 

 

Israeli independent films
Israeli LGBT-related films
2010s Hebrew-language films
Israeli drama films
2018 films
Films about Orthodox and Hasidic Jews
2018 LGBT-related films
Films about LGBT and Judaism
Films about cattle
Films set in Jerusalem